CalAmp is an Irvine, California-based provider of Internet of things (IoT) software applications, cloud services, data intelligence and telematics products and services.  The company's technology includes edge computing devices and SaaS-based applications for remotely tracking and managing vehicles, drivers, cargo and other mobile assets. The company also owns the patents and trademarks for the LoJack Stolen Vehicle Recovery System and provides connected car and lot management products.

History
CalAmp was founded as California Amplifier Inc. in Newbury Park, California in 1981, by Jacob Inbar and David Nichols, who worked together at a microwave division of Eaton Corporation. The company originally made amplifiers and other equipment used to transmit microwave signals for satellite video and broadband communications. The company began trading on NASDAQ in 1983.

By 1986, the company had relocated to Camarillo, California, and stopped making amplifiers for the consumer market.

In 1999, the company entered the direct broadcast satellite (DBS) market by acquiring Texas-based Gardiner Group, a satellite dish component provider.

In December 2003, the company acquired communications software company Vytek Corp, for $76.8 million.

In March 2004, the company relocated to Oxnard, California. In August, the company changed its name to CalAmp Corp.

In May 2006, the company acquired Montreal, Canada-based wireless radio company Dataradio, to expand its wireless data communications business for public safety and machine to machine (M2M) applications.  It also acquired the mobile resource management line from Carlsbad, California-based location tracking company TechnoCom to offer enterprise asset tracking and fleet management applications.

In 2007, the company acquired the Aercept Vehicle Tracking business from wireless telematics service provider AirIQ.  

By 2010, the company was focused on selling IoT hardware and DBS solutions.

In December 2012, the company announced the acquisition of Herndon, Virginia-based fleet management application provider Wireless Matrix Corp for $53 million.  

In February 2013, the company announced a stock offering that was intended in part to fund the Wireless Matrix Corp purchase. 

In April 2015, CalAmp bought telematics startup Crashboxx, a provider of a vehicle risk management system for insurance companies and fleet operators.

By 2016, the company had phased out its DBS business and shifted its focus to SaaS-based telematics products and services. In February, CalAmp announced it was acquiring stolen vehicle recovery company LoJack Corporation, for $134 million, and the deal closed in March. In April, the company announced it was moving its headquarters from Oxnard to Irvine, California. In September, the company introduced the LoJack LotSmart automotive dealer inventory management solution and LoJack SureDrive connected car app.

In March 2016, CalAmp acquired the LoJack company for $134 million.

In January 2019, the company launched a smartwatch-sized pet tracking device called Maven, in conjunction with logistics software company CargoSense.  In March 2019, the company acquired two LoJack licensees, Car Track in Mexico, and Tracker in the United Kingdom. In April, the company acquired fellow telematics provider Synovia Solutions for $50 million.  In March 2020, CEO Michael Burdiek retired, and was replaced by Jeff Gardner.

References

External links
 Official website

Companies based in Irvine, California
Companies listed on the Nasdaq
Companies established in 1981
Fleet management
Intelligent transportation systems
Internet of things
Supply chain management
Telematics
Vehicle telematics
Vehicle technology
Wireless locating